HolidayCheck Group AG is an exchange-listed internet group, registered in Munich, Germany. It provides online portals for package travel reviews and bookings in Germany, Austria and Switzerland, under the HolidayCheck brand. 

The group was created in 2001 as Tomorrow Focus AG by the merger of Focus Digital AG and Tomorrow Internet AG, and renamed HolidayCheck Group AG in 2016 to reflect its focus on travel businesses.

Origin 
HolidayCheck was started in 1999 by students in Konstanz, Germany, including Markus Schott, Hakan Öktem, Jens Freiter, Jörg Kampshoff and Sascha Vasic. 

Initially, the site was operated privately under the domain hotel reviews.de. In 2003, the television station RTL reported on the portal. The ensuing publicity prompted the founders to register the site as a commercial venture, debuting on 11 November 2003.

Operations 
HolidayCheck users can book travel, compare offers and rate their experience. 

The company claims 2.5 million members and 8 million reviews, from an average of 24.13 million visits and 133 million page impressions per month (June 2017). HolidayCheck also publishes an online travel magazine, Away. 

HolidayCheck also operates Zoover, a Dutch-language hotel review portal, as well as weather platform Meteovista and car rental comparison site MietwagenCheck.

The company was a founding member of the Association of New Tourism (VNT), an industry group of non-corporate travel agents promoting new distribution channels, latterly the Association of Internet Travel Distribution (VIR).

Ownership and acquisitions 
In July 2006, Hubert Burda Media Holding acquired 80 percent of the shares in HolidayCheck AG for €60 million, through its subsidiaries Burda Digital Ventures and Tomorrow Focus AG. Tomorrow Focus took a 51% share and Burda Digital Ventures took 29 %.

In 2007 Burda Digital Ventures sold its shares to Tomorrow Focus AG. At the time, HolidayCheck was the market leader among German-speaking hotel and travel review sites, having Hotelcheck.de. In 2008, HolidayCheck acquired rival portal Urlaub.com.

In January 2009, Tomorrow Focus AG acquired a further 14 percent stake for €21.6 million, taking its stake to 94 percent of the company. The founders sold their remaining 6 percent of the company in June 2013; Tomorrow Focus AG then became the sole owner.

The site's parent company made further investments in the travel sector in 2015, while selling several online publishing businesses at the time, including Focus Online and the Huffington Post. The company changed its name from Tomorrow Focus AG to HolidayCheck Group AG in 2016.

Financial results
For the 2018 financial year the firm reported operating EBITDA of €10.7 million (7.7%), on total revenue of €138.9m. HolidayCheck is listed on the Prime Standard segment of the Frankfurt stock exchange.

As of July 2019, the company had 471 employees in Bottighofen, Munich, Poznan and Warsaw. The management board consists of Georg Hesse (Chief Executive Officer), Dirk Scheuermann (Chief Financial Officer) and Nate Glissmeyer (Chief Product Officer and SVP Engineering).

External links 
 The HolidayCheck AG website
 Sources

Companies based in Munich
Mass media in Munich